USS LST-40 was a United States Navy  used exclusively in the Asiatic-Pacific Theater during World War II. Like many of her class, she was not named and is properly referred to by her hull designation.

Construction 
LST-40 was laid down on 3 June 1943, at Pittsburgh, Pennsylvania by the Dravo Corporation; launched on 7 August 1943; sponsored by Miss Hilda Sambolt; and commissioned on 15 September 1943.

Service history  
During World War II, LST-40 was assigned to the Asiatic-Pacific theater. 

Following the war, LST-40 performed occupation duty in the Far East until mid-February 1946. She returned to the United States and was decommissioned on 18 February 1946. In February 1947, she was transferred to the United States Army Military Government in Korea, as a sale, and was struck from the Navy list on 5 March, that same year.

Awards
LST-40 earned four battle stars for World War II service.

See also 

 List of United States Navy ships
 Landing craft
 List of United States Navy LSTs

References

Bibliography 

 
 

 

World War II amphibious warfare vessels of the United States
Ships built in Pittsburgh
1943 ships
LST-1-class tank landing ships of the United States Navy
Ships built by Dravo Corporation